Below are the squads for the men's football tournament at the 1990 Asian Games, played in Beijing, China.

Group A

China
Coach: Gao Fengwen

Pakistan
Coach: Muhammad Idrees

Singapore
Coach: Robin Chan

South Korea
Coach: Park Jong-hwan

Group B

Iran
Coach: Ali Parvin

Malaysia
Coach: Ahmad Shafie

North Korea
Coach: Myong Dong-chan

Group C

Hong Kong
Coach: Kwok Ka Ming

Kuwait
Coach: Mohammad Karam

Thailand
Coach:  Carlos Roberto

Yemen
Coach: Azzam Khalifa

Group D

Bangladesh
Coach:  Nasser Hejazi

Japan
Coach: Kenzo Yokoyama

Saudi Arabia
Coach:  Paulo Massa

References

 Korea Results 1990
 Japan Results 1990
 China Results 1990

1990
Squads